Dhana is a census town in Sagar district  in the state of Madhya Pradesh, India.

Demographics
 India census, Dhana had a population of 10,295. Males constitute 61% of the population and females 39%.

References

Cities and towns in Sagar district
Sagar, Madhya Pradesh